Euloxia is a genus of moths in the family Geometridae described by Warren in 1894.

Species
 Euloxia argocnemis (Meyrick, 1888)
 Euloxia beryllina (Meyrick, 1888)
 Euloxia fugitivaria (Guenée, 1857)
 Euloxia hypsithrona (Meyrick, 1888)
 Euloxia isadelpha Turner, 1910
 Euloxia leucochorda (Meyrick, 1888)
 Euloxia meandraria (Guenée, 1857)
 Euloxia meracula Turner, 1942
 Euloxia ochthaula (Meyrick, 1888)
 Euloxia pyropa (Meyrick, 1888)

References

Geometridae